Cryptochironomus is a genus of European non-biting midges in the subfamily Chironominae of the bloodworm family Chironomidae.

Species
C. albofasciatus (Stæger, 1839)
C. argus Roback, 1957
C. blarina (Townes, 1945)
C. chaetoala (Sublette, 1960)
C. crassiforceps Goetghebuer, 1932
C. defectus (Kieffer, 1913)
C. denticulatus (Goetghebuer, 1921)
C. digitatus (Malloch, 1915)
C. fulvus Johannsen, 1905
C. hirtalatus (Beck and Beck, 1964)
C. obreptans (Walker, 1856)
C. parafulvus (Beck and Beck, 1964)
C. ponderosus (Sublette, 1964)
C. psittacinus (Meigen, 1830)
C. psittacinus Meigen, 1830
C. redekei (Kruseman, 1933)
C. rostratus Kieffer, 1921
C. scimitarus Townes, 1945
C. sorex Townes, 1945
C. supplicans (Meigen, 1830)
C. ussouriensis (Goetghebuer, 1933)

References

Chironomidae
Nematoceran flies of Europe
Taxa named by Jean-Jacques Kieffer